Gerrit Versteeg may refer to:

Gerrit Versteeg (architect) (1872–1938), Dutch architect
Gerrit Versteeg (enterprise architect) (born 1960), Dutch enterprise architect